Randall George Hillier (born March 30, 1960) is a Canadian former professional ice hockey defenceman.

Early life
Hillier was born in Toronto. As a youth, he played in the 1973 Quebec International Pee-Wee Hockey Tournament with a minor ice hockey team from Toronto.

Career 
Hillier was drafted by the Boston Bruins in 1980 while playing for the Sudbury Wolves of the OHL.  He served the Bruins during his first three NHL seasons, but was best known for his seven seasons with the Pittsburgh Penguins. He was a member of the Pittsburgh team which won the 1991 Stanley Cup. He went on to become the assistant coach of the Penguins during the 1998 and 2002–04 seasons.  He currently works for an investment company in Pittsburgh.

Career statistics

References

External links
 

1960 births
Living people
Baltimore Skipjacks players
Boston Bruins draft picks
Boston Bruins players
Buffalo Sabres players
Canadian ice hockey defencemen
Erie Blades players
New York Islanders players
Pittsburgh Penguins coaches
Pittsburgh Penguins players
Ice hockey people from Toronto
Springfield Indians players
Stanley Cup champions
Sudbury Wolves players
Canadian ice hockey coaches